ROCE or RoCE may refer to:

 Return on capital employed, an accounting ratio used in finance
 Return on common equity, a measure of the profitability of a business in relation to the equity
 RDMA over Converged Ethernet, a computer network protocol